Suppression of tumorigenicity 5 is a protein that in humans is encoded by the ST5 gene. ST5 orthologs have been identified in nearly all mammals for which complete genome data are available.

Function 

This gene was identified by its ability to suppress the tumorigenicity of Hela cells in nude mice. The protein encoded by this gene contains a C-terminal region that shares similarity with the Rab 3 family of small GTP binding proteins. This protein preferentially binds to the SH3 domain of c-Abl kinase, and acts as a regulator of MAPK1/ERK2 kinase, which may contribute to its ability to reduce the tumorigenic phenotype in cells. Three alternatively spliced transcript variants of this gene encoding distinct isoforms are identified.

References

Further reading